La Rochette is a commune in the Charente department in southwestern France.

In 2016, an ancient hunter-gatherer that was excavated at La Rochette was found to carry the mtDNA haplogroup M. The Late Pleistocene specimen was dated to 28,000 years ago.

Population

See also
Communes of the Charente department

References

Communes of Charente